Gardenia transvenulosa is a species of plant in the family Rubiaceae. It is found in Kenya and Tanzania.

References

transvenulosa
Vulnerable plants
Taxonomy articles created by Polbot